Live in Tokyo is a live album by American jazz vibraphonist Gary Burton recorded in Tokyo on June 2, 1971 and released in Japan as Atlantic label.
It features Burton with guitarist Sam Brown, bassist Tony Levin and drummer Bill Goodwin.

Track listing 
Ballet - 7:55
On the Third Day - 7:45
Sunset Bell - 5:00
The Green Mountains - 5:45
African Flower - 7:30
Portsmouth Figurations - 5:10

Personnel 
 Gary Burton – vibes
 Sam Brown – guitar
 Tony Levin – electric bass
 Bill Goodwin – drums

References 

Atlantic Records live albums
Gary Burton albums
1971 live albums